Wyers Brook is an unincorporated community in Restigouche County, New Brunswick, Canada.

See also
History of New Brunswick
List of communities in New Brunswick
List of historic places in Restigouche County, New Brunswick
List of people from Restigouche County, New Brunswick

References

Communities in Restigouche County, New Brunswick